Rangel Ignatov (born 6 April 1997) is a Bulgarian footballer who plays as a winger or attacking midfielder for Botev Ihtiman.

Club career

Botev Plovdiv

Youth squads
Rangel Ignatov was part of Botev Plovdiv U17 and U19 squads. He won the U19 national championship in 2015 and even scored a goal in the final.

First team
Rangel Ignatov was included in the first team squad for the pre-season training during the winter break of season 2015–16. He participated in several friendly games and scored a goal in the 4–1 win over Poli Timișoara. He was released on 22 February 2017.

Pirin Razlog (loan)
On 17 February 2016 Ignatov was loaned to Pirin Razlog until the end of the season in B Grupa. Rangel made a debut on 28 February during the goalless draw with Litex Lovech. On 12 March, he came on as a substitute during the 0–1 away win over FC Sozopol and got seriously injured, which kept him out of action until the end of the season. Ignatov will miss the other games until the end of the season due to dislocated shoulder.

Maritsa Plovdiv
On 22 February 2017, immediately after his contract termination with Botev Plovdiv, Ignatov joined his boyhood club Maritsa Plovdiv.

Botev Galabovo
At the end of the 2017–18 season, following Maritsa's relegation to Third League, Ignatov signed with Botev Galabovo.

International career
Ignatov has earned several caps for the Bulgarian U18 and U19 team.

On 3 January 2015 Ignatov came on a substitute and scored a goal for the 2–0 win over Kazakhstan U19. On the next day, on 4 January 2015, he played in the 0–1 defeat from Slovenia U19. Three days later, on 7 January 2015, Ignatov scored a goal for the 2–0 win over Lithuania U19. He also participated in the 1–1 draw with Latvia U19 and 0–3 defeat from Japan U19.

On 24 February 2016, Ignatov came on as a second-half substitute in the friendly game with Serbia U19 which was lost with 0–2.

References

1997 births
Living people
Footballers from Plovdiv
Bulgarian footballers
Bulgaria youth international footballers
Botev Plovdiv players
FC Pirin Razlog players
PFC Nesebar players
FC Maritsa Plovdiv players
FC Botev Galabovo players
FC Oborishte players
FC Sportist Svoge players
First Professional Football League (Bulgaria) players
Second Professional Football League (Bulgaria) players
Association football midfielders
Association football wingers